During the 1999–2000 English football season, Macclesfield Town Football Club competed in the Football League Third Division where they finished in 13th position on 65 points.

Final league table

Results
Macclesfield Town's score comes first

Legend

Football League Division Three

League Cup

FA Cup

Football League Trophy

Squad
Appearances for competitive matches only

References

Macclesfield Town 1999–2000 at soccerbase.com (use drop down list to select relevant season)

See also
1999–2000 in English football

Macclesfield Town F.C. seasons
Macclesfield Town